Metro Theatre may refer to:
 Metro Theater (New York City), 2626 Broadway, Upper West Side, New York City
 Metro Theatre (Toronto), Toronto, Canada
 The Metro Theatre, Sydney, Australia
 Metro Arts Theatre, Brisbane, Australia